The 1977 Torneo Descentralizado, the top category of Peruvian football (soccer), was played by 16 teams. The national champion was Alianza Lima.

The season was divided into 3 stages.  The Preliminary Tournament contested in two groups (home and away matches plus 2 inter-group    matches); each group winner qualified for the Championship Group. The second stage was the Descentralised (league tournament); the top 4 qualified for the Championship Group and the bottom two played for relegation. Championship Group was contested by 6 teams in home and away matches; teams carried their Descentralised Tournament record.
Although finishing fifth in Descentralised, Universitario qualified for Championship Group, as Alianza had already qualified in Preliminary Tournament. Municipal and Cienciano played a third relegation playoff on a neutral ground, as each team won one match after home and away matches.

Teams

Torneo Interzonal

Group A

Group B

Torneo Descentralizado

Relegation play-off

Final Group

Title

External links
RSSSF Peru 1977

Peru
Tor
Peruvian Primera División seasons